"Department of Youth" is a song by rock musician Alice Cooper featured on his Welcome to My Nightmare album. The song peaked at No. 67 on The Billboard Hot 100.

Reception
Creem said the song, "is a second cousin to "School's Out" with a chorus of child-things sounding like Cooper's dead babies resurrected to sing back-up vocals." NME agreed it was, "School's Out" all over again, complete with demented kiddie choir and watered-down Clockwork Orange braggadoccio."

Melody Maker wrote, "This is typical, a heavy metal Marc Bolan. It's gritty and gruesome, but underneath the yells and screaming arrangement, it's really just a simple, catchy pop song. Don't analyse it, just bop as Alice screeches his way up the chart."

Record World said that "the supreme spokesman for angry young men everywhere is even more vital and exciting here."

Charts

Weekly charts

Year-end charts

Notable covers
Pretty Boy Floyd covered the song on their album, Porn Stars.

References

1975 singles
Songs written by Alice Cooper
Songs written by Dick Wagner
Songs written by Bob Ezrin
Alice Cooper songs
Song recordings produced by Bob Ezrin
1974 songs